Evangelos Spiliotopoulos (born c. 1973) is a Greek-American screenwriter, film producer, and film director.

Early life 
Spiliotopoulos was born in Greece, and graduated from high school there. Soon after, he moved to the United States and attended the University of Delaware to get an undergraduate degree in film theory; he then attended American University for a master's degree in screenwriting. After moving to Los Angeles in 1995, his first job in the industry was in a television film Trial by Fire as an intern.

Career 
In the 2000s, Spiliotopoulos wrote several animated projects for Walt Disney Pictures. He was attached to write a prequel of to the classic animated Snow White and the Seven Dwarfs film. However, the project was finally cancelled when Pixar was acquired by The Walt Disney Company in 2006.

In April 2009, Spiliotopoulos was set to write the screenplay for the action film Wanted 2, a sequel to the 2008 film Wanted.

In June 2013, Universal acquired the remake rights to the Japanese 2007 anime film Vexille and set Spiliotopoulos to write the screenplay.

In July 2014, Spiliotopoulos was hired by 20th Century Fox to write the script for the 2014 novel Seven Wonders written by Ben Mezrich. Spiliotopoulos had already rewritten the script of the horror film Ouija, but his draft wasn't used in the film.

In 2014, Spiliotopoulos re-wrote the screenplay for the action-adventure fantasy film Hercules, originally written by Ryan J. Condal. Brett Ratner directed the film which released on July 25, 2014 by Paramount Pictures.

Spiliotopoulos wrote the screenplay of action-adventure fantasy film The Huntsman: Winter's War, along with Craig Mazin, and rewritten by Frank Darabont. Cedric Nicolas-Troyan directed the film, which was released on April 22, 2016 by Universal Pictures.

Spiliotopoulos and Stephen Chbosky wrote Disney's live action musical romantic fantasy film Beauty and the Beast, which was directed by Bill Condon. The film was released on March 17, 2017.

Spiliotopoulos received a "story by" credit, with David Auburn, for the Charlie's Angels reboot film of 2019, which was written and directed by Elizabeth Banks.

In 2021, Spiliotopoulos' directorial debut, the horror film The Unholy was released.

Writing credits 
Theatrical release

Direct-to-video

Television

References

External links 
 
Evan Spiliotopoulos Interview with Scripts & Scribes

1970s births
20th-century American male writers
20th-century American screenwriters
21st-century American male writers
21st-century American screenwriters
American male screenwriters
American writers of Greek descent
Greek emigrants to the United States
Greek screenwriters
Living people
Screenwriters from California
Writers from Los Angeles
Year of birth missing (living people)